The Brockham Railway Museum was a  narrow gauge railway based at the site of the Brockham Limeworks, near Dorking, Surrey. When it closed in 1982, the majority of the collection was moved to the Amberley Museum & Heritage Centre where it formed the nucleus of the Amberley Museum Railway.

History
In 1960, the Dorking Greystone Lime Co. of Betchworth, Surrey, was disposing of its railway stock. The company's general manager, Major Taylerson, was keen to see the locomotives preserved. The London Area Group of the Narrow Gauge Railway Society (NGRS) purchased one of the pair of  gauge Fletcher Jennings tank locos, Townsend Hook. This was placed on display at Sheffield Park on the embryonic Bluebell Railway. However this was not a particularly satisfactory arrangement, and efforts were made to find an alternative home.

In October 1961, members of the NGRS visited the disused chalk pit of Brockham Lime & Hearthstone Co. Ltd. The site was deemed suitable, and arrangements were made to establish a museum there, less than a mile west of the site of the Dorking Greystone Lime Co. The site was cleared in early 1962. Townsend Hook moved there in May 1962, and was followed a week later by the two Orenstein & Koppel diesel locos from Betchworth: No. 6 Monty and No. 7, named The Major in honour of Major Taylerson. The Brockham Museum Trust was formed as a separate entity from the NGRS to run the museum.

The Peckett locomotive Scaldwell was purchased from Staveley Minerals and moved to the museum on 20 March 1964. The locomotive was steamed the following weekend and driven into the newly refurbished shed - the first and last time it was operated in preservation.

In 1965, Cliffe Hill Granite Co. Ltd. donated Peter, a Bagnall  built in 1917, with the provision that it had to be put into working order. Peter initially went to the Lincolnshire Coast Light Railway, but moved to Brockham on 21 August. Another Bagnall arrived in 1967, when  Polar Bear was brought over from the Groudle Glen Railway. Brockham was initially offered the entire railway "lock, stock and barrel" for £50 which included both Polar Bear and her sister, Sea Lion (in a dilapidated state), along with all the carriages many of which had been badly vandalised. The plan was to sell rail and surplus equipment for scrap and use that to fund the move, but arranging this on the island proved difficult. The offer was withdrawn before the contract could be completed, and they were then offered the locomotives and any of the carriages. In the end they purchased Polar Bear and two carriages (which had been in a shed and so not been vandalised), along with many spares from Sea Lion, which had been out of use since 1939, to keep Polar Bear in traffic. The museum continued to expand, becoming home to many items in Amberley's current collection.

In 1973 the museum acquired 60 lengths of portable "Jubilee" track and 8 wagons from the Hampton & Kempton Waterworks Railway. In December several locomotives arrived from storage at the Cadeby Light Railway, including the last remaining narrow-gauge locomotive built by the Bedford firm of J&C Howard (works number 982 of 1981).

In the period 1972 to 1978 the museum was home to many privately owned locomotives and rolling stock. Many of these were owned by Peter Nicholson, Rich Morris, and Michael Jacob who formed Narrow Gauge Enterrprises and arranged to create a museum at Gloddfa Ganol in North Wales. They moved their locomotives out of Brockham on 18 July 1978 in a convoy of 5 trucks.

Closure 
The Brockham Museum Association formed an Educational Trust in 1972, with the Association now being a supporters club. This was a step towards the eventual opening of Brockham to the public, however the access to the site via an ungated level crossing was always an issue. Then in 1976 it appeared the lease of the Brockham Limeworks site was unlikely to be renewed when it came up in 1978. This caused the search for a new site, and for a while it was hoped a move to Ravensbury Park in Merton was the answer, but this failed to get outline planning consent. Then in early 1977 Surrey County Council purchased a large tract of land including Brockham limeworks, and discussions indicated a new lease was now likely. However in 1978 Narrow Gauge Enterprises moved their large collection of privately owned locomotives and rolling stock from the site to their new Gloddfa Ganol museum in North Wales.

In 1979 the trustees prepared the "Brockham Museum Development Handbook", a plan for the development of the museum, which among other things would provide information for the landowners, the planning authorities, potential sponsors, and the Museum officials and volunteers. Included in this was the need for a substantial site lease term (21 years minimum), the need for a commitment from Surrey County Council regarding parking arrangements, and the need for appropriate planning consent for change of use to a public museum, and this last issue was to become a problem.

In 1981, planning consent for public museum was again sought from the local authorities and this time it was firmly refused, because the only road access was across an ungated level crossing over the British Railways line from Dorking to Reigate. The Chalk Pits Museum was in its second year then, and discussions started in earnest about relocating the Brockham collection to Amberley and amalgamating the aims of the Brockham Museum Trust and the Southern Industrial History Centre Trust. The museum closed in 1982, with most of the remaining items moving to Amberley over the summer.

Locomotives 
Locomotives on-site at Brockham in 1982.

The table below lists other locomotives that were at some time at Brockham Museum. Most were privately owned by members of the museum. In the period in which the museum was active there were still industrial narrow gauge railways in Britain, and a small group of people saved some of the rarer examples of locomotives for the future. There were numerous moves of these privately owned locos between different locations as they changed hands or were moved by the owners to different locations to be worked on or stored.

References

Heritage railways in Surrey
Museums in Surrey
Defunct museums in England
2 ft gauge railways in England
Museums established in 1962
1982 disestablishments in England
Museums disestablished in 1982
Railway museums in England
Narrow-gauge railway museums in the United Kingdom